Yevgeni Vladimirovich Ovsiyenko (born 18 January 1988) is a Russian professional football player.

External links
 
 

1988 births
Sportspeople from Krasnodar
Living people
Russian footballers
Association football defenders
PFC Spartak Nalchik players
FC Baltika Kaliningrad players
FC Irtysh Omsk players
FC Tambov players
FC Urozhay Krasnodar players
Russian Premier League players